Thirumalaiyar was a Tamil poet, scholar, and commentator known for his commentary on the Thirukkural. He was among the canon of Ten Medieval Commentators of the Kural text most highly esteemed by modern scholars. His work, however, has been lost along with other four ancient commentators, namely, Dhamatthar, Nacchar, Dharumar, and Mallar.

See also

 Ten Medieval Commentators
 Bhashya
 Commentaries in Tamil literary tradition

References

Further reading
 M. Arunachalam (2005). Tamil Ilakkiya Varalaru, Padhinaindhaam Nootraandu [History of Tamil Literature, 15th century].
 
 D. M. Vellaivaaranam (1983). Tirukkural Uraikotthu. Thiruppananthal Shri Kasimadam Publications.

Tirukkural
Tamil poets
Tirukkural commentators
Ten medieval commentators
Medieval Tamil poets
Tamil-language writers
Tamil scholars
Scholars from Tamil Nadu